Aleksov is a surname. Notable people with the surname include:

Bojan Aleksov, Serbian human rights activist
Marin Aleksov, CEO

Bulgarian-language surnames
Serbian surnames